The Positron-Electron Tandem Ring Accelerator (PETRA) is one of the particle accelerators at the German national laboratory DESY in Hamburg, Germany. At the time of its construction, it was the biggest storage ring of its kind and still is DESY's second largest synchrotron after HERA. PETRA’s original purpose was research in elementary particle physics. From 1978 to 1986 it was used to study electron–positron collisions with the four experiments JADE, MARK-J, PLUTO and TASSO. The discovery of the gluon, the carrier particle of the strong nuclear force, by the TASSO collaboration in 1979 is counted as one of the biggest successes. PETRA was able to accelerate electrons and positrons to 19 GeV.
Research at PETRA led to an intensified international use of the facilities at DESY. Scientists from China, France, Israel, the Netherlands, Norway, the United Kingdom and the USA participated in the first experiments at PETRA alongside many German colleagues.

PETRA II 
In 1990, the facility was taken into operation again under the name PETRA II as a pre-accelerator for protons and electrons/positrons for the new particle accelerator HERA. In March 1995, PETRA II was equipped with undulators to create greater amounts of synchrotron radiation with higher energies, especially in the X-ray part of the spectrum. PETRA II served the Hamburg Synchrotron Radiation Laboratory (HASYLAB) at DESY as a source of high-energy synchrotron radiation in three test experimental areas. In PETRA II, positrons were accelerated to up to 12 GeV.

PETRA III 
PETRA III is the third incarnation for the PETRA storage ring, serving a regular user programme as one of the most brilliant storage-ring-based X-ray sources worldwide since 2009. The accelerator produces a particle energy of 6 GeV. There are currently three experimental halls (named after various famous scientists). The largest, named Max von Laue Hall, has a concrete floor over 300 m long that was poured as a single piece in order to limit vibrations. PETRA III delivers hard X-ray beams of very high brilliance to over 40 experimental stations.

References

Further reading

External links
 PETRA III website
 DESY website

Particle physics facilities
Gluons
Buildings and structures in Altona, Hamburg
Synchrotron radiation facilities
Particle accelerators